Al-Shaddadah Subdistrict  is a subdistrict of al-Hasakah District in southern al-Hasakah Governorate, northeastern Syria. Administrative centre is the city of al-Shaddadah.

At the 2004 census, the subdistrict had a population of 58,916.

Cities, towns and villages

References 

Al-Hasakah District
al-Shaddadah